Andronikos III  may refer to:
 Andronikos III Palaiologos (1297–1341), Byzantine emperor 1328–1341
 Andronikos III of Trebizond (1310–1332), Emperor of Trebizond from 1330 to 1332